Gilbert Keith Chesterton  (29 May 1874 – 14 June 1936) was an English writer, philosopher, Christian apologist, a literary and art critic. He has been referred to as the "prince of paradox". Of his writing style, Time observed: "Whenever possible, Chesterton made his points with popular sayings, proverbs, allegories—first carefully turning them inside out."

Chesterton created the fictional priest-detective Father Brown, and wrote on apologetics. Even some of those who disagree with him have recognised the wide appeal of such works as Orthodoxy and The Everlasting Man. Chesterton routinely referred to himself as an orthodox Christian, and came to identify this position more and more with Catholicism, eventually converting to Roman Catholicism from high church Anglicanism. Biographers have identified him as a successor to such Victorian authors as Matthew Arnold, Thomas Carlyle, John Henry Newman and John Ruskin.

Biography

Early life 

Chesterton was born in Campden Hill in Kensington, London, the son of Edward Chesterton (1841–1922), an estate agent, and Marie Louise, née Grosjean, of Swiss French origin. Chesterton was baptised at the age of one month into the Church of England, though his family themselves were irregularly practising Unitarians. According to his autobiography, as a young man he became fascinated with the occult and, along with his brother Cecil, experimented with Ouija boards. He was educated at St Paul's School, then attended the Slade School of Art to become an illustrator. The Slade is a department of University College London, where Chesterton also took classes in literature, but did not complete a degree in either subject. He married Frances Blogg in 1901; the marriage lasted the rest of his life. Chesterton credited Frances with leading him back to Anglicanism, though he later considered Anglicanism to be a "pale imitation". He entered full communion with the Roman Catholic Church in 1922.  The couple were unable to have children.

A friend from schooldays was Edmund Clerihew Bentley, inventor of the clerihew, a whimsical, four-line biographical poem. Chesterton himself wrote clerihews and illustrated his friend's first published collection of poetry, Biography for Beginners (1905), which popularised the clerihew form. He became godfather to Bentley's son, Nicolas, and opened his novel The Man Who Was Thursday with a poem written to Bentley.

Career

In September 1895, Chesterton began working for the London publisher George Redway, where he remained for just over a year. In October 1896 he moved to the publishing house T. Fisher Unwin, where he remained until 1902. During this period he also undertook his first journalistic work, as a freelance art and literary critic. In 1902 the Daily News gave him a weekly opinion column, followed in 1905 by a weekly column in The Illustrated London News, for which he continued to write for the next thirty years.

Early on Chesterton showed a great interest in and talent for art. He had planned to become an artist, and his writing shows a vision that clothed abstract ideas in concrete and memorable images.  Even his fiction contained carefully concealed parables. Father Brown is perpetually correcting the incorrect vision of the bewildered folks at the scene of the crime and wandering off at the end with the criminal to exercise his priestly role of recognition and repentance. For example, in the story "The Flying Stars", Father Brown entreats the character Flambeau to give up his life of crime: "There is still youth and honour and humour in you; don't fancy they will last in that trade. Men may keep a sort of level of good, but no man has ever been able to keep on one level of evil. That road goes down and down. The kind man drinks and turns cruel; the frank man kills and lies about it. Many a man I've known started like you to be an honest outlaw, a merry robber of the rich, and ended stamped into slime."

Chesterton loved to debate, often engaging in friendly public disputes with such men as George Bernard Shaw, H. G. Wells, Bertrand Russell and Clarence Darrow. According to his autobiography, he and Shaw played cowboys in a silent film that was never released. On 7 January 1914 Chesterton (along with his brother Cecil and future sister-in-law Ada) took part in the mock-trial of John Jasper for the murder of Edwin Drood. Chesterton was Judge and George Bernard Shaw played the role of foreman of the jury.

His girth gave rise to an anecdote during the First World War, when a lady in London asked why he was not "out at the Front"; he replied, "If you go round to the side, you will see that I am." On another occasion he remarked to his friend George Bernard Shaw, "To look at you, anyone would think a famine had struck England." Shaw retorted, "To look at you, anyone would think you had caused it." P. G. Wodehouse once described a very loud crash as "a sound like G. K. Chesterton falling onto a sheet of tin". Chesterton usually wore a cape and a crumpled hat, with a swordstick in hand, and a cigar hanging out of his mouth. He had a tendency to forget where he was supposed to be going and miss the train that was supposed to take him there. It is reported that on several occasions he sent a telegram to his wife Frances from an incorrect location, writing such things as "Am in Market Harborough. Where ought I to be?" to which she would reply, "Home". Chesterton himself told this story, omitting, however, his wife's alleged reply, in his autobiography.

In 1931, the BBC invited Chesterton to give a series of radio talks. He accepted, tentatively at first. However, from 1932 until his death, Chesterton delivered over 40 talks per year. He was allowed (and encouraged) to improvise on the scripts. This allowed his talks to maintain an intimate character, as did the decision to allow his wife and secretary to sit with him during his broadcasts. The talks were very popular. A BBC official remarked, after Chesterton's death, that "in another year or so, he would have become the dominating voice from Broadcasting House." Chesterton was nominated for the Nobel Prize in Literature in 1935.

Chesterton was part of the Detection Club, a society of British mystery authors founded by Anthony Berkeley in 1928. He was elected as the first president and served from 1930 to 1936 till he was succeeded by E. C. Bentley.

Death and veneration 

Chesterton died of congestive heart failure on 14 June 1936, aged 62, at his home in Beaconsfield, Buckinghamshire. His last words were a greeting of good morning spoken to his wife Frances. The sermon at Chesterton's Requiem Mass in Westminster Cathedral, London, was delivered by Ronald Knox on 27 June 1936. Knox said, "All of this generation has grown up under Chesterton's influence so completely that we do not even know when we are thinking Chesterton." He is buried in Beaconsfield in the Catholic Cemetery. Chesterton's estate was probated at £28,389, .

Near the end of Chesterton's life, Pope Pius XI invested him as Knight Commander with Star of the Papal Order of St. Gregory the Great (KC*SG). The Chesterton Society has proposed that he be beatified.

Writing

Chesterton wrote around 80 books, several hundred poems, some 200 short stories, 4,000 essays (mostly newspaper columns), and several plays. He was a literary and social critic, historian, playwright, novelist, Catholic theologian and apologist, debater, and mystery writer. He was a columnist for the Daily News, The Illustrated London News, and his own paper, G. K.'s Weekly; he also wrote articles for the Encyclopædia Britannica, including the entry on Charles Dickens and part of the entry on Humour in the 14th edition (1929). His best-known character is the priest-detective Father Brown, who appeared only in short stories, while The Man Who Was Thursday is arguably his best-known novel. He was a convinced Christian long before he was received into the Catholic Church, and Christian themes and symbolism appear in much of his writing. In the United States, his writings on distributism were popularised through The American Review, published by Seward Collins in New York.

Of his nonfiction, Charles Dickens: A Critical Study (1906) has received some of the broadest-based praise. According to Ian Ker (The Catholic Revival in English Literature, 1845–1961, 2003), "In Chesterton's eyes Dickens belongs to Merry, not Puritan, England"; Ker treats Chesterton's thought in chapter 4 of that book as largely growing out of his true appreciation of Dickens, a somewhat shop-soiled property in the view of other literary opinions of the time. The biography was largely responsible for creating a popular revival for Dickens's work as well as a serious reconsideration of Dickens by scholars.

Chesterton's writings consistently displayed wit and a sense of humour. He employed paradox, while making serious comments on the world, government, politics, economics, philosophy, theology and many other topics.

T.S. Eliot summed up his work as follows:

Eliot commented further that "His poetry was first-rate journalistic balladry, and I do not suppose that he took it more seriously than it deserved. He reached a high imaginative level with The Napoleon of Notting Hill, and higher with The Man Who Was Thursday, romances in which he turned the Stevensonian fantasy to more serious purpose. His book on Dickens seems to me the best essay on that author that has ever been written. Some of his essays can be read again and again; though of his essay-writing as a whole, one can only say that it is remarkable to have maintained such a high average with so large an output."

Views and contemporaries

Wilde and Shaw 

In his book Heretics, Chesterton said this of Oscar Wilde: "The same lesson [of the pessimistic pleasure-seeker] was taught by the very powerful and very desolate philosophy of Oscar Wilde. It is the carpe diem religion; but the carpe diem religion is not the religion of happy people, but of very unhappy people. Great joy does not gather the rosebuds while it may; its eyes are fixed on the immortal rose which Dante saw." More briefly, and with a closer approximation to Wilde's own style, he wrote in his 1908 book Orthodoxy concerning the necessity of making symbolic sacrifices for the gift of creation: "Oscar Wilde said that sunsets were not valued because we could not pay for sunsets. But Oscar Wilde was wrong; we can pay for sunsets. We can pay for them by not being Oscar Wilde."

Chesterton and George Bernard Shaw were famous friends and enjoyed their arguments and discussions. Although rarely in agreement, they each maintained good will toward, and respect for, the other. In his writing, Chesterton expressed himself very plainly on where they differed and why. In Heretics he writes of Shaw:

Shaw represented the new school of thought, modernism, which was rising at the time. Chesterton's views, on the other hand, became increasingly focused towards the Church. In Orthodoxy he wrote: "The worship of will is the negation of will... If Mr Bernard Shaw comes up to me and says, 'Will something', that is tantamount to saying, 'I do not mind what you will', and that is tantamount to saying, 'I have no will in the matter.' You cannot admire will in general, because the essence of will is that it is particular."

This style of argument is what Chesterton refers to as using 'Uncommon Sense' – that is, that the thinkers and popular philosophers of the day, though very clever, were saying things that were nonsensical. This is illustrated again in Orthodoxy: "Thus when Mr H. G. Wells says (as he did somewhere), 'All chairs are quite different', he utters not merely a misstatement, but a contradiction in terms. If all chairs were quite different, you could not call them 'all chairs'." Or, again from Orthodoxy:

Chesterton, as a political thinker, cast aspersions on both progressivism and conservatism, saying, "The whole modern world has divided itself into Conservatives and Progressives. The business of Progressives is to go on making mistakes. The business of the Conservatives is to prevent the mistakes from being corrected." He was an early member of the Fabian Society, but resigned at the time of the Boer War.

The author James Parker, in The Atlantic, gave a modern appraisal:

Advocacy of Catholicism 

Chesterton's The Everlasting Man contributed to C. S. Lewis's conversion to Christianity. In a letter to Sheldon Vanauken (14 December 1950), Lewis called the book "the best popular apologetic I know", and to Rhonda Bodle he wrote (31 December 1947) "the [very] best popular defence of the full Christian position I know is G. K. Chesterton's The Everlasting Man". The book was also cited in a list of 10 books that "most shaped his vocational attitude and philosophy of life".

Chesterton's hymn "O God of Earth and Altar" was printed in The Commonwealth and then included in the English Hymnal in 1906. Several lines of the hymn appear in the beginning of the song "Revelations" by the British heavy metal band Iron Maiden on their 1983 album Piece of Mind. Lead singer Bruce Dickinson in an interview stated "I have a fondness for hymns. I love some of the ritual, the beautiful words, Jerusalem and there was another one, with words by G.K. Chesterton O God of Earth and Altar – very fire and brimstone: 'Bow down and hear our cry'. I used that for an Iron Maiden song, "Revelations". In my strange and clumsy way I was trying to say look it's all the same stuff."

Étienne Gilson praised Chesterton's book on St Thomas Aquinas: "I consider it as being, without possible comparison, the best book ever written on Saint Thomas... the few readers who have spent twenty or thirty years in studying St. Thomas Aquinas, and who, perhaps, have themselves published two or three volumes on the subject, cannot fail to perceive that the so-called 'wit' of Chesterton has put their scholarship to shame."

Archbishop Fulton J. Sheen, the author of 70 books, identified Chesterton as the stylist who had the greatest impact on his own writing, stating in his autobiography Treasure in Clay, "the greatest influence in writing was G. K. Chesterton who never used a useless word, who saw the value of a paradox, and avoided what was trite." Chesterton wrote the introduction to Sheen's book God and Intelligence in Modern Philosophy; A Critical Study in the Light of the Philosophy of Saint Thomas.

Charges of antisemitism
Chesterton faced accusations of antisemitism during his lifetime, saying in his 1920 book The New Jerusalem that it was something "for which my friends and I were for a long period rebuked and even reviled". Despite his protestations to the contrary, the accusation continues to be repeated. An early supporter of Captain Dreyfus, by 1906 he had turned into an anti-dreyfusard. From the early 20th century, his fictional work included caricatures of Jews, stereotyping them as greedy, cowardly, disloyal and communists. Martin Gardner suggests that Four Faultless Felons was allowed to go out of print in the United States because of the "anti-Semitism which mars so many pages."

The Marconi scandal of 1912–13 brought issues of anti-Semitism into the political mainstream. Senior ministers in the Liberal government had secretly profited from advance knowledge of deals regarding wireless telegraphy, and critics regarded it as relevant that some of the key players were Jewish. According to historian Todd Endelman, who identified Chesterton as among the most vocal critics, "The Jew-baiting at the time of the Boer War and the Marconi scandal was linked to a broader protest, mounted in the main by the Radical wing of the Liberal Party, against the growing visibility of successful businessmen in national life and their challenge to what were seen as traditional English values."

In a work of 1917, titled A Short History of England, Chesterton considers the royal decree of 1290 by which Edward I expelled Jews from England, a policy that remained in place until 1655. Chesterton writes that popular perception of Jewish moneylenders could well have led Edward I's subjects to regard him as a "tender father of his people" for "breaking the rule by which the rulers had hitherto fostered their bankers' wealth". He felt that Jews, "a sensitive and highly civilized people" who "were the capitalists of the age, the men with wealth banked ready for use", might legitimately complain that "Christian kings and nobles, and even Christian popes and bishops, used for Christian purposes (such as the Crusades and the cathedrals) the money that could only be accumulated in such mountains by a usury they inconsistently denounced as unchristian; and then, when worse times came, gave up the Jew to the fury of the poor".

In The New Jerusalem Chesterton dedicated a chapter to his views on the Jewish question: the sense that Jews were a distinct people without a homeland of their own, living as foreigners in countries where they were always a minority. He wrote that in the past, his position:

In the same place he proposed the thought experiment (describing it as "a parable" and "a flippant fancy") that Jews should be admitted to any role in English public life on condition that they must wear distinctively Middle Eastern garb, explaining that "The point is that we should know where we are; and he would know where he is, which is in a foreign land."

Chesterton, like Belloc, openly expressed his abhorrence of Hitler's rule almost as soon as it started. As Rabbi Stephen Wise wrote in a posthumous tribute to Chesterton in 1937:

In The Truth about the Tribes Chesterton blasted German race theories, writing: "the essence of Nazi Nationalism is to preserve the purity of a race in a continent where all races are impure."

The historian Simon Mayers points out that Chesterton wrote in works such as The Crank, The Heresy of Race, and The Barbarian as Bore against the concept of racial superiority and critiqued pseudo-scientific race theories, saying they were akin to a new religion. In The Truth About the Tribes Chesterton wrote, "the curse of race religion is that it makes each separate man the sacred image which he worships. His own bones are the sacred relics; his own blood is the blood of St. Januarius." Mayers records that despite "his hostility towards Nazi antisemitism … [it is unfortunate that he made] claims that 'Hitlerism' was a form of Judaism, and that the Jews were partly responsible for race theory." In The Judaism of Hitler, as well as in A Queer Choice and The Crank, Chesterton made much of the fact that the very notion of "a Chosen Race" was of Jewish origin, saying in The Crank: "If there is one outstanding quality in Hitlerism it is its Hebraism" and "the new Nordic Man has all the worst faults of the worst Jews: jealousy, greed, the mania of conspiracy, and above all, the belief in a Chosen Race."

Mayers also shows that Chesterton portrayed Jews not only as culturally and religiously distinct, but racially as well. In The Feud of the Foreigner (1920) he said that the Jew "is a foreigner far more remote from us than is a Bavarian from a Frenchman; he is divided by the same type of division as that between us and a Chinaman or a Hindoo. He not only is not, but never was, of the same race."

In The Everlasting Man, while writing about human sacrifice, Chesterton suggested that medieval stories about Jews killing children might have resulted from a distortion of genuine cases of devil-worship. Chesterton wrote:

The American Chesterton Society has devoted a whole issue of its magazine, Gilbert, to defending Chesterton against charges of antisemitism. Likewise, Ann Farmer, author of Chesterton and the Jews: Friend, Critic, Defender, writes, "Public figures from Winston Churchill to Wells proposed remedies for the 'Jewish problem' – the seemingly endless cycle of anti-Jewish persecution – all shaped by their worldviews. As patriots, Churchill and Chesterton embraced Zionism; both were among the first to defend the Jews from Nazism," concluding that "A defender of Jews in his youth – a conciliator as well as a defender – GKC returned to the defence when the Jewish people needed it most."

Opposition to eugenics
In Eugenics and Other Evils, Chesterton attacked eugenics as Parliament was moving towards passage of the Mental Deficiency Act 1913. Some backing the ideas of eugenics called for the government to sterilise people deemed "mentally defective"; this view did not gain popularity but the idea of segregating them from the rest of society and thereby preventing them from reproducing did gain traction. These ideas disgusted Chesterton who wrote, "It is not only openly said, it is eagerly urged that the aim of the measure is to prevent any person whom these propagandists do not happen to think intelligent from having any wife or children." He blasted the proposed wording for such measures as being so vague as to apply to anyone, including "Every tramp who is sulk, every labourer who is shy, every rustic who is eccentric, can quite easily be brought under such conditions as were designed for homicidal maniacs. That is the situation; and that is the point... we are already under the Eugenist State; and nothing remains to us but rebellion." He derided such ideas as founded on nonsense, "as if one had a right to dragoon and enslave one's fellow citizens as a kind of chemical experiment". Chesterton mocked the idea that poverty was a result of bad breeding: "[it is a] strange new disposition to regard the poor as a race; as if they were a colony of Japs or Chinese coolies... The poor are not a race or even a type. It is senseless to talk about breeding them; for they are not a breed. They are, in cold fact, what Dickens describes: 'a dustbin of individual accidents,' of damaged dignity, and often of damaged gentility."

Chesterton's fence
'Chesterton's fence' is the principle that reforms should not be made until the reasoning behind the existing state of affairs is understood. The quotation is from Chesterton's 1929 book, The Thing: Why I Am a Catholic, in the chapter, "The Drift from Domesticity":

"Chesterbelloc"

Chesterton is often associated with his close friend, the poet and essayist Hilaire Belloc. George Bernard Shaw coined the name "Chesterbelloc" for their partnership, and this stuck. Though they were very different men, they shared many beliefs; in 1922, Chesterton joined Belloc in the Catholic faith, and both voiced criticisms of capitalism and socialism. They instead espoused a third way: distributism. G. K.'s Weekly, which occupied much of Chesterton's energy in the last 15 years of his life, was the successor to Belloc's New Witness, taken over from Cecil Chesterton, Gilbert's brother, who died in World War I.

In his book On the Place of Gilbert Chesterton in English Letters, Belloc wrote that "Everything he wrote upon any one of the great English literary names was of the first quality.  He summed up any one pen (that of Jane Austen, for instance) in exact sentences; sometimes in a single sentence, after a fashion which no one else has approached.  He stood quite by himself in this department. He understood the very minds (to take the two most famous names) of Thackeray and of Dickens. He understood and presented Meredith. He understood the supremacy in Milton. He understood Pope. He understood the great Dryden. He was not swamped as nearly all his contemporaries were by Shakespeare, wherein they drown as in a vast sea – for that is what Shakespeare is. Gilbert Chesterton continued to understand the youngest and latest comers as he understood the forefathers in our great corpus of English verse and prose."

Legacy

Literary
Chesterton's socio-economic system of Distributism affected the sculptor Eric Gill, who established a commune of Catholic artists at Ditchling in Sussex. The Ditchling group developed a journal called The Game, in which they expressed many Chestertonian principles, particularly anti-industrialism and an advocacy of religious family life. His novel The Man Who Was Thursday inspired the Irish Republican leader Michael Collins with the idea that "If you didn't seem to be hiding nobody hunted you out." Collins's favourite work of Chesterton was The Napoleon of Notting Hill, and he was "almost fanatically attached to it", according to his friend Sir William Darling. His column in the Illustrated London News on 18 September 1909 had a profound effect on Mahatma Gandhi. P. N. Furbank asserts that Gandhi was "thunderstruck" when he read it, while Martin Green notes that "Gandhi was so delighted with this that he told Indian Opinion to reprint it." Another convert was Canadian media theorist Marshall McLuhan, who said that the book What's Wrong with the World changed his life in terms of ideas and religion. The author Neil Gaiman stated that he grew up reading Chesterton in his school's library, and that The Napoleon of Notting Hill influenced his own book Neverwhere. Gaiman based the character Gilbert from the comic book The Sandman on Chesterton, while the novel he co-wrote with Terry Pratchett is dedicated to him. The Argentine author and essayist Jorge Luis Borges cited Chesterton as influential on his fiction, telling interviewer Richard Burgin that "Chesterton knew how to make the most of a detective story."

Education
Chesterton's many references to education and human formation have inspired a variety of educators including the 44 schools of the Chesterton Schools Network (which includes the Chesterton Academy founded by Dale Ahlquist. Pulisher and educator Christopher Perrin (who completed his doctoral work on Chesterton) makes frequent reference to Chesterton in his work with classical schools.

Namesakes 
In 1974, Father Ian Boyd, C.S.B, founded The Chesterton Review, a scholarly journal devoted to Chesterton and his circle. The journal is published by the G.K. Chesterton Institute for Faith and Culture based in Seton Hall University, South Orange, New Jersey.

In 1996, Dale Ahlquist founded the American Chesterton Society to explore and promote his writings.

In 2008, a Catholic high school, Chesterton Academy, opened in the Minneapolis area. In the same year Scuola Libera Chesterton opened in San Benedetto del Tronto, Italy.

In 2012, a crater on the planet Mercury was named Chesterton after the author.

In 2014, G.K. Chesterton Academy of Chicago, a Catholic high school, opened in Highland Park, Illinois.

A fictionalised G. K. Chesterton is the central character in the Young Chesterton Chronicles, a series of young adult adventure novels by John McNichol, and in the G K Chesterton Mystery series, a series of detective novels by Australian Kel Richards.

Major works

Books

 
 
 
 
 
 
 
 
 
  (detective fiction)

Short stories
 "The Trees of Pride", 1922
 "The Crime of the Communist", Collier's Weekly, July 1934.
 "The Three Horsemen", Collier's Weekly, April 1935.
 "The Ring of the Lovers", Collier's Weekly, April 1935.
 "A Tall Story", Collier's Weekly, April 1935.
 "The Angry Street – A Bad Dream", Famous Fantastic Mysteries, February 1947.

Plays 

 Magic, 1913.

References

Citations

Sources 
Cited biographies

Further reading

 
 
 Belmonte, Kevin (2011). Defiant Joy: The Remarkable Life and Impact of G.K. Chesterton. Nashville, Tenn.: Thomas Nelson.
 Blackstock, Alan R. (2012). The Rhetoric of Redemption: Chesterton, Ethical Criticism, and the Common Man. New York. Peter Lang Publishing.
 Braybrooke, Patrick (1922). Gilbert Keith Chesterton. London: Chelsea Publishing Company.
 Cammaerts, Émile (1937). The Laughing Prophet: The Seven Virtues And G. K. Chesterton. London: Methuen & Co., Ltd.
 Campbell, W. E. (1908). "G.K. Chesterton: Inquisitor and Democrat",  The Catholic World, Vol. LXXXVIII, pp. 769–782.
 Campbell, W. E. (1909). "G.K. Chesterton: Catholic Apologist" The Catholic World, Vol. LXXXIX, No. 529, pp. 1–12.
 Chesterton, Cecil (1908). G.K. Chesterton: A Criticism. London: Alston Rivers (Rep. by John Lane Company, 1909).
 Clipper, Lawrence J. (1974). G.K. Chesterton. New York: Twayne Publishers.
 Coates, John (1984). Chesterton and the Edwardian Cultural Crisis. Hull University Press.
 Coates, John (2002). G.K. Chesterton as Controversialist, Essayist, Novelist, and Critic. Lewiston, New York: Edwin Mellen Press.
 Conlon, D. J. (1987). G.K. Chesterton: A Half Century of Views. Oxford University Press.
 
 
 Corrin, Jay P. (1981). G.K. Chesterton & Hilaire Belloc: The Battle Against Modernity. Ohio University Press.
 Ervine, St. John G. (1922). "G.K. Chesterton". In: Some Impressions of my Elders. New York: The Macmillan Company, pp. 90–112.
 
 Gilbert Magazine (November/December 2008). Vol. 12, No. 2-3, Special Issue: Chesterton & The Jews.
 Haldane, John. 'Chesterton's Philosophy of Education', philosophy, Vol. 65, No. 251 (Jan. 1990), pp. 65–80.
 Hitchens, Christopher (2012). "The Reactionary",  The Atlantic.
 Herts, B. Russell (1914). "Gilbert K. Chesterton: Defender of the Discarded". In: Depreciations. New York: Albert & Charles Boni, pp. 65–86.
 Hollis, Christopher (1970). The Mind of Chesterton. London: Hollis & Carter.
 Hunter, Lynette (1979). G.K. Chesterton: Explorations in Allegory. London: Macmillan Press.
 Jaki, Stanley (1986). Chesterton: A Seer of Science. University of Illinois Press.
 Jaki, Stanley (1986). "Chesterton's Landmark Year". In: Chance or Reality and Other Essays. University Press of America.
 Kenner, Hugh (1947). Paradox in Chesterton. New York: Sheed & Ward.
 Kimball, Roger (2011). "G. K. Chesterton: Master of Rejuvenation",  The New Criterion, Vol. XXX, p. 26.
 Kirk, Russell (1971). "Chesterton, Madmen, and Madhouses", Modern Age, Vol. XV, No. 1, pp. 6–16.
 Knight, Mark (2004). Chesterton and Evil. Fordham University Press.
 Lea, F. A. (1947). "G. K. Chesterton". In: Donald Attwater (ed.) Modern Christian Revolutionaries. New York: Devin-Adair Co.
 McCleary, Joseph R. (2009). The Historical Imagination of G.K. Chesterton: Locality, Patriotism, and Nationalism. Taylor & Francis.
 McLuhan, Marshall (January 1936), "G. K. Chesterton: A Practical Mystic",  Dalhousie Review, 15 (4): 455–464.
 
 Oddie, William (2010). Chesterton and the Romance of Orthodoxy: The Making of GKC, 1874–1908. Oxford University Press.
 Orage, Alfred Richard. (1922). "G.K. Chesterton on Rome and Germany". In: Readers and Writers (1917–1921). London: George Allen & Unwin, pp. 155–161.
 Oser, Lee (2007). The Return of Christian Humanism: Chesterton, Eliot, Tolkien, and the Romance of History. University of Missouri Press.
 
 
 Peck, William George (1920). "Mr. G.K. Chesterton and the Return to Sanity". In: From Chaos to Catholicism. London: George Allen & Unwin, pp. 52–92.
 Raymond, E. T. (1919). "Mr. G.K. Chesterton". In: All & Sundry. London: T. Fisher Unwin, pp. 68–76.
 Schall, James V. (2000). Schall on Chesterton: Timely Essays on Timeless Paradoxes. Catholic University of America Press.
 Scott, William T. (1912). Chesterton and Other Essays. Cincinnati: Jennings & Graham.
 Seaber, Luke (2011). G.K. Chesterton's Literary Influence on George Orwell: A Surprising Irony. Lewiston, New York: Edwin Mellen Press.
 Sheed, Wilfrid (1971). "Chesterbelloc and the Jews", The New York Review of Books, Vol. XVII, No. 3.
 Shuster, Norman (1922). "The Adventures of a Journalist: G.K. Chesterton". In: The Catholic Spirit in Modern English Literature. New York: The Macmillan Company, pp. 229–248.
 Slosson, Edwin E. (1917). "G.K. Chesterton: Knight Errant of Orthodoxy". In: Six Major Prophets. Boston: Little, Brown and Company, pp. 129–189.
 Smith, Marion Couthouy (1921). "The Rightness of G.K. Chesterton", The Catholic World, Vol. CXIII, No. 678, pp. 163–168.
 Stapleton, Julia (2009). Christianity, Patriotism, and Nationhood: The England of G.K. Chesterton. Lanham, MD: Lexington Books.
 
 Tonquédec, Joseph de (1920). G.K. Chesterton, ses Idées et son Caractère, Nouvelle Librairie National.
 Ward, Maisie (1952). Return to Chesterton, London: Sheed & Ward.
 West, Julius (1915). G.K. Chesterton: A Critical Study. London: Martin Secker.

External links

 
 
 
 
 
 
 Works by G.K. Chesterton, at HathiTrust
 
 What's Wrong: GKC in Periodicals Articles by G. K. Chesterton in periodicals, with critical annotations.
 .
 G. K. Chesterton: Quotidiana
 G.K. Chesterton research collection at The Marion E. Wade Center at Wheaton College
 G.K. Chesterton Archival Collection at the University of St. Michael's College at the University of Toronto
 
 Listen G.K. Chesterton works on Youtube

 
1874 births
1936 deaths
20th-century English novelists
20th-century English poets
Alumni of the Slade School of Fine Art
Alumni of University College London
Aphorists
Anti-consumerists
Anti-Masonry
Anti-imperialism
Antisemitism in the United Kingdom
British anti-capitalists
British anti-communists
British humorous poets
British male poets
British Roman Catholics
English World War I poets
20th-century English male writers
Burials in Buckinghamshire
Environmental writers
Christian apologists
Christian novelists
Christian poets
Christian humanists
Christian radicals
Lay theologians
Converts to Roman Catholicism from Anglicanism
Converts to Roman Catholicism from atheism or agnosticism
Critics of classical liberalism
Critics of atheism
English autobiographers
English Catholic poets
English crime fiction writers
English essayists
English fantasy writers
English male journalists
English male novelists
English male short story writers
English mystery writers
English Roman Catholic writers
English short story writers
British detective fiction writers
Knights Commander with Star of the Order of St. Gregory the Great
Male essayists
Members of the Detection Club
Members of the Fabian Society
People educated at St Paul's School, London
People from Kensington
Catholic philosophers
English Roman Catholic theologians
Simple living advocates
Distributism
British Zionists